Lola Astanova (born on 3 July 1982 in Tashkent, USSR) is a Russian-American pianist noted for her visual performance and piano transcriptions.

Career
Born in Tashkent, Uzbekistan, at the age of six Astanova entered the V. Uspensky Specialized School of Music for Gifted Children, studying under professor Tamara Popovich and frequently visiting Moscow for lessons with professor Lev Naumov.

Astanova started touring as a concert pianist at the age of eight. In 1996, she became a laureate of the International Chopin Competition. In 1998, she was featured in the UNESCO documentary "Prodigies of the 20th Century". In 2003, she emigrated to the United States and continued her career in America.

Astanova was featured in the 2007 Classical Superstars Fantasy Concert hosted by ABC's television host Regis Philbin. The concert was featured in the 100th anniversary issue of the Neiman Marcus Christmas Book and offered for $1.6 million. In August 2008, The National September 11 Memorial & Museum announced Ms. Astanova's performance on the famed Steinway concert piano of Vladimir Horowitz at the "Notes of Hope" benefit hosted by Mayor Michael Bloomberg and Senator Hillary Clinton. The performance raised funds for the National September 11 Memorial & Museum in New York City.

On 19 January 2012 Astanova made her Carnegie Hall debut, with the New York Times noting that "her taste for drama and her extreme physical abandon end up emphasizing that there isn't a great deal of emotion in her playing". A special Tribute to Vladimir Horowitz gala concert hosted by Julie Andrews. Horowitz's student, American pianist Byron Janis, was among the concert's attendees. All proceeds from the performance were donated to the American Cancer Society. In March 2012, Astanova appeared on the cover of Palm Beach Society magazine ahead of her performance with Jahja Ling at the Kravis Center. On 30 May 2012 she performed a duet with Byron Janis during his Lifetime Achievement Award ceremony at the Lincoln Center for the Performing Arts.

Astanova's performance of Gershwin's "Rhapsody in Blue" with Gerard Schwarz and the All-Star Orchestra, was featured in the "Visions of New York" television special on PBS and received the 2016 Emmy Award for Special Event Coverage (Other than News or Sports).

In 2018, Astanova appeared in "The Journey to the Theater of Silence", a documentary about her collaboration with Italian tenor Andrea Bocelli. The film also featured interviews with producer and composer David Foster. During the same year, Astanova's collaboration with Stjepan Hauser of the band 2Cellos came out under the name "Lola and Hauser". The duo released 7 tracks together including the Moonlight Sonata, "Love Story" and QUEEN's We Are the Champions.

Astanova played piano and keyboards on the track El Trato from the El Disco album by Alejandro Sanz.  El Disco won the 2020 Grammy for Best Latin Pop Album.

In May of 2020, Sony Music released Astanova's original electronic crossover track titled "Elise Was Here".
Her video clips are strongly imbued with the prosaic erotic charge, i.e. erotic capital, that mostly seeks to seduce post-patriarchal listeners.

Fashion
Astanova has received attention for her performance style and appearance, often wearing extremely high-heels and tiny mini skirts. She has expressed her love for fashion stating that "some extraordinary artists" work in this field. In June 2012, she was named among Top 10 Style Icons in Classical Music by Limelight magazine.

In 2014 Astanova performed at the New York Ball honoring editor-in-chief of Vogue Italia Franca Sozzani, with Donald Trump, Valentino Garavani, Baz Luhrmann, Steven Klein, Zac Posen, Coco Rocha, and Peter Dundas attending the event and Kris Jenner introducing Astanova on stage.

References

American classical pianists
21st-century American composers
Russian classical pianists
American women classical pianists
Russian women pianists
Living people
Rice University alumni
21st-century American women musicians
21st-century classical pianists
21st-century American pianists
21st-century women composers
1982 births